Seiersberg is a former municipality in the district of Graz-Umgebung in the Austrian state of Styria. Since the 2015 Styria municipal structural reform, it is part of the municipality Seiersberg-Pirka.

Population

References

Cities and towns in Graz-Umgebung District